This article is about the particular significance of the year 1807 to Wales and its people.

Incumbents
Lord Lieutenant of Anglesey – Henry Paget 
Lord Lieutenant of Brecknockshire and Monmouthshire – Henry Somerset, 6th Duke of Beaufort
Lord Lieutenant of Caernarvonshire – Thomas Bulkeley, 7th Viscount Bulkeley
Lord Lieutenant of Cardiganshire – Thomas Johnes
Lord Lieutenant of Carmarthenshire – George Rice, 3rd Baron Dynevor 
Lord Lieutenant of Denbighshire – Sir Watkin Williams-Wynn, 5th Baronet    
Lord Lieutenant of Flintshire – Robert Grosvenor, 1st Marquess of Westminster 
Lord Lieutenant of Glamorgan – John Stuart, 1st Marquess of Bute 
Lord Lieutenant of Merionethshire - Sir Watkin Williams-Wynn, 5th Baronet
Lord Lieutenant of Montgomeryshire – Edward Clive, 1st Earl of Powis
Lord Lieutenant of Pembrokeshire – Richard Philipps, 1st Baron Milford
Lord Lieutenant of Radnorshire – George Rodney, 3rd Baron Rodney

Bishop of Bangor – John Randolph
Bishop of Llandaff – Richard Watson
Bishop of St Asaph – William Cleaver 
Bishop of St Davids – Thomas Burgess

Events
9 March - Edward Herbert, 2nd Earl of Powis, assumes the name and arms of Herbert only in lieu of those of Clive by Royal licence, in order to inherit the Powis Castle estates of his uncle.
25 March - Opening of the world's first fare-paying passenger railway - the horse-drawn Oystermouth Railway between Oystermouth and Mumbles.
7 May - The first Welsh language Bible issued by the British and Foreign Bible Society is published.
29 September - The world's oldest international football stadium, the Racecourse Ground, opens in Wrexham for horse racing; it will not host football games until 1872.
December (approximate) - Welsh Wesleyan preachers make their first visit to Brecon.
unknown dates
North Wales Chronicle begins publication in Bangor.
Walter Coffin opens the first coal seam at Dinas Rhondda, after purchasing farmland.
William Taitt of the Dowlais Company brings a libel action against Samuel Homfray. Damages of £500 are awarded.
The red dragon on a green mount is adopted as the Royal Badge of Wales.

Arts and literature

New books
Thomas Charles - Hyfforddwr
Peter Bailey Williams - Trysorfa Gwybodaeth

Music
Anthem y Saint… gan Evan Dafydd (collection of hymns)

Births
23 May - Samuel Warren, barrister, novelist and MP (died 1877)
22 September - Sir Stephen Glynne, 9th Baronet, landowner and politician (died 1874)
7 October - Joshua Hughes, Bishop of St Asaph (died 1889)
date unknown - Sir William Milbourne James, judge (died 1881)
probable - Levi Gibbon, balladeer (died 1870)

Deaths
April – Edward Owen, Anglican priest, headmaster and translator, 78?
18 July – Thomas Jones, mathematician, 51
12 October – Thomas Wynn, 1st Baron Newborough, former MP and Lord Lieutenant of Caernarvonshire, 70/71
date unknown
David Davies, minister and editor of Y Geirgrawn, age unknown
Joseph Turner, architect.
probable – John Lloyd, clergyman and academic, 53?

References

 
 Wales